Dee Bateman is an English professional darts player.

Bateman made her World Championship debut in 2008, losing in the quarter-finals to eventual champion Anastasia Dobromyslova.  Bateman reached the semi-finals of the 2009 World Masters, with wins over Karen Lawman and Anne Kirk before losing to the eventual winner, outsider Linda Ithurralde.

Bateman's partner is BDO referee Rab Butler.

World Championship Results

BDO
 2008: Quarter Final: (lost to Anastasia Dobromyslova 0–2)
 2016: First round: (lost to Trina Gulliver 1–2)

External links
 Profile and stats on Darts Database

References

English darts players
Living people
1966 births
British Darts Organisation players
Sportspeople from Portsmouth
People from Barrow-in-Furness
Female darts players